Fotballklubben Jerv is a Norwegian football club from Grimstad. Jerv is the Norwegian name for wolverine. They currently play in the Eliteserien.

History
The club was founded in 1921, as Vestergatens FK, named after the street in which the foundation took place, but later changed name to Djerv and then Jerv.

In the 1970s and 1980s the team had a number of foreign coaches, including Bo Johansson who managed the team in 1984 and 1985 and went on to coach several clubs and national teams. In November 2007 Jerv signed another well-known ex-footballer Tore André Dahlum as coach.

In 2021, Jerv were promoted to the top division, Eliteserien, for the first time in their history. They were promoted through the play-offs, where they beat Brann in the final. The score was 4–4 after extra time, but Jerv won 8–7 on penalties.

FK Jerv has no women's section, as this split away in 1999 to form a new club Amazon Grimstad FK.

Season-by-season record

Sources:

From 1991 Eliteserien has been the highest Norwegian level and 1. divisjon the second highest, followed by third level (2. divisjon) and fourth level (3. divisjon). 1. divisjon was the highest level prior to 1991.

Since 1987 it has been 3 points for a win. In 1987 there was a penalty shoot-out when a game ended in a draw, with the winner getting 2 points and the loser 1 point.

P = Played
W = Games won
D = Games drawn
L = Games lost
F = Goals for
A = Goals against
Pts = Points
Pos = Final position

DQ = Disqualified
QR1 = First Qualifying Round
QR2 = Second Qualifying Round
R1 = Round 1
R2 = Round 2
R3 = Round 3
R4 = Round 4

R5 = Round 5
R6 = Round 6
QF = Quarter-finals
SF = Semi-finals
RU = Runners-up
W = Winners

Current squad

Out on loan

Technical staff

References

RSSSF.no

External links
Official site
Official Facebookpage
J.J. Ugland Stadion Levermyr - Nordic Stadiums

 
Jerv
Jerv
Jerv
Jerv
1921 establishments in Norway